Moon crab can refer to several crab taxa:

 Family Matutidae
 Gecarcinus quadratus from coastal Pacific regions between Mexico and Ecuador
 Gecarcinus lateralis from coastal Atlantic regions between Florida and Guyana
 Cardisoma [species]:
 C. armatum from Africa
 C. carnifex from Africa and the Indo-Pacific
 C. crassum and C. guanhumi from the Americas

Animal common name disambiguation pages